Michael or Mike Edwards may refer to:

Sports

American football
Mike Edwards (linebacker) (born 1957), American football player
Mike Edwards (cornerback) (born 1991), American NFL football player for the New York Jets
Mike Edwards (safety) (born 1996), American NFL football player for the Tampa Bay Buccaneers

Association football (soccer)
Mike Edwards (footballer, born 1974), English footballer for Tranmere Rovers 
Mike Edwards (footballer, born 1980), English footballer for Notts County F.C. 
Michael Edwards (soccer) (born 2000), American soccer player

Other sports
Mike Edwards (basketball) (born early 1950s), American basketball player
Mike Edwards (cricketer) (born 1940), English cricketer
Mike Edwards (second baseman) (born 1952), American Major League Baseball player 
Mike Edwards (motorcyclist) (born 1962), British motorcycle racer
Eddie the Eagle (Michael Edwards, born 1963), British ski-jumper
Mike Edwards (pole vaulter) (born 1968), British pole vaulter
Mike Edwards (rugby league) (born 1974), Welsh rugby league footballer
Mike Edwards (third baseman) (born 1976), American Major League Baseball player
Mike Edwards (high jumper) (born 1990), British-Nigerian champion at the 2018 British Indoor Athletics Championships

Musicians
Michael Edwards (American composer) (1893–1962), American composer and musician
Michael Edwards (Australian composer) (born 1974), Australian composer
Michael Edwards (British composer) (born 1968), British composer
Mike Edwards (musician) (1948–2010), cellist of the band Electric Light Orchestra

Academics
Michael Edwards (international development specialist) (born 1957), British academic
Michael Edwards (literary scholar) (born 1938), British professor of English at the Collège de France

Others
Michael Edwards (actor) (born 1944), American actor
Michael Edwards (art therapist) (1930–2010), painter and art therapist
Michael Edwards (fragrance expert) (born 1943), developer of the fragrance wheel and publisher of Fragrances of the World
Mike Edwards (Scottish journalist), with Scotland Today
Mike Edwards (American journalist) editor with National Geographic
Mickey Edwards (born 1937), former Republican congressman

See also
Sir Michael Edwardes (1930–2019), South African business executive